Panormus or Panormos, also known as Aulopotamos (Αὐλοπόταμος), was a harbour of ancient Crete.

Its site is located near the modern Kastelli Mylopotamou/Panormos.

References

Populated places in ancient Crete
Former populated places in Greece